Hafnia may refer to:

 Copenhagen (of which it is the Latin name)
 Hafnia (bacterium)
 Hafnium(IV) oxide

See also